Kevin McMenamin is an Irish Gaelic footballer. He has played at senior level for Donegal and London county teams, as well as club football for Termon, Tír Chonaill Gaels and Donegal Boston.

His nickname is "Wappa".

A man of a "pint-sized" disposition, McMenamin was born in Belfast. He was included in the Antrim under-21 panel but progressed no further until Donegal came calling. He is a Tennent's GAA Writers Monthly Merit Award winner, having picked up the award after just three games at inter-county level with Donegal. He scored a goal in the 2007 National Football League semi-final against Kildare at Croke Park that gave Donegal a 1–13 to 1–11 win (i.e., a two-point victory).

McMenamin left the Donegal squad during the 2009 National Football League. In May that year he left for London in search of work, transferred from Termon to Tír Chonaill Gaels and made his debut for London as a substitute in a challenge game with Waterford in Waterford and then played in that year's Connacht Senior Football Championship game against Galway in Ruislip. His Termon clubmates Declan and Mark Alcorn were already with Tír Chonaill Gaels when he arrived.

He also played for Donegal Boston.

References

External links
 Kevin McMenamin at gaainfo.com
 Press Coverage

1980s births
Living people
Antrim Gaelic footballers
Donegal Boston Gaelic footballers
Donegal inter-county Gaelic footballers
Gaelic footballers who switched code
London inter-county Gaelic footballers
Termon Gaelic footballers
Tír Chonaill Gaels Gaelic footballers
Expatriate sportspeople in England